Jerry Tardieu, (born 13 July 1967) is a Haitian author, entrepreneur, and politician.  He represents Petion-ville in the Chamber of Deputies.

Biography 

Tardieu's family made their fortune in shipping and in real estate.  In Haiti, he studied at Institution Saint-Louis de Gonzague before moving on to earn a degree from European University College, followed by a master's degree in Public Administration from Harvard University.  There is a history of political service on both sides of his family:  his paternal grandfather was elected to the Chamber of Deputies and his maternal great-grandfather had been War Minister during the presidency of Michel Oreste.

Tardieu served as the president of the Alumni Association of Harvard University Graduates of Haiti, former vice-president of the Chamber of Commerce and Industry (CCIH), former President of the Council for Economic and Social Development (CDES).

In the world of business and academia, his skills in both the private and public sectors contributed to Mr. Tardieu being regularly consulted in the development of institutional partnerships involving the Haitian state and the private sector. During his professional career, Tardieu was the CEO of many Haitian companies ranging from leather, real estate to hospitality. During the 2000s, as the president of the CCIH, Tardieu represented the private sector in many varied missions reuniting public and private decision makers. Aside from his activities in business field, Tardieu is involved in his community through KAP – Kolektif Abitan Petyonvil", a civil society engaged in the development and community-building aspect of the commune of Pétion-Ville.

Tardieu is a regular speaker at Haitian and foreign universities on various topics of interest covered by his publications or articles. The focus of his speeches and writings revolve around the idea of development and modernization of Haiti. In 2006 he published "Haïti: L’Avenir en Face, Un essai à success”. In 2014, “Investir et s’Investir en Haïti: Un acte de foi”, that garnered record sales in Haiti and the diaspora. In 2009, given his vast knowledge of the challenges relating to development and modernization, Tardieu was selected as a member of the Presidential Commission having for mandate to formulate propositions to amend the mother law of the Constitution of Haiti. As a symbol of his contributions to Haiti, Tardieu received numerous and notable awards and recognition medals abroad and in Haiti.

Books
 L'avenir en face. Haïti à l'épreuve de la mondialisation et du défaitisme de ses élites. (2005) Montréal: Les Editions du CIDIHCA.
 Investir et s'investir en Haïti, un acte de foi. (2014) Montréal: Les Editions du CIDIHCA.

References

Living people
Haitian businesspeople
Harvard Kennedy School alumni
1967 births